Austrovenus aucklandica, or the Auckland Islands cockle, is a bivalve mollusc of the family Veneridae.

References
 Powell A. W. B., New Zealand Mollusca, William Collins Publishers Ltd, Auckland, New Zealand 1979 

Veneridae
Bivalves of New Zealand
Molluscs described in 1932